Wila Salla (Aymara wila red, salla rocks, cliffs, "red rocks", also spelled Velasalla) may refer to:

 Wila Salla, a mountain in Peru
 Wila Salla (Bolivia), a mountain in the Potosí Department, Bolivia
 Wila Salla (Oruro), a mountain in the Oruro Department, Bolivia
 Wila Salla (Oruro-Potosí), a mountain in the Oruro Department and in the Potosí Department, Bolivia